
Strategic essentialism, a major concept in postcolonial theory, was introduced in the 1980s by the Indian literary critic and theorist Gayatri Chakravorty Spivak. It refers to a political tactic in which minority groups, nationalities, or ethnic groups mobilize on the basis of shared gendered, cultural, or political identity to represent themselves. While strong differences may exist between members of these groups, and amongst themselves they engage in continuous debates, it is sometimes advantageous for them to temporarily "essentialize" themselves, despite it being based on erroneous logic, and to bring forward their group identity in a simplified way to achieve certain goals, such as equal rights or antiglobalization.

Spivak's understanding of the term was first introduced in the context of cultural negotiations, never as an anthropological category. In her 2008 book Other Asias, Spivak disavowed the term, indicating her dissatisfaction with how the term has been deployed in nationalist enterprises to promote (non-strategic) essentialism.

The concept also comes up regularly in queer theory, feminist theory, deaf studies, and specifically in the work of Luce Irigaray, who refers to it as mimesis.

See also
Epochalism
Identity politics
Intersectionality
Social constructionism
Stuart Hall (cultural theorist)

References

Further reading
 A. Prasad, Postcolonial Theory and Organizational Analysis (2003)
 Abraham, Susan. “Strategic Essentialism in Nationalist Discourses: Sketching a Feminist Agenda in the Study of Religion.” Journal of Feminist Studies in Religion, vol. 25, no. 1, 2009, pp. 156–161. JSTOR. 
 Elizabeth Grosz, “Sexual Difference and the Problem of Essentialism,” The Essential Difference. Ed. Naomi Schor and Elizabeth Weed, pp. 82–97.

External links
 Biography and Glossary of Key Terms in the Work of Gayatri Chakravorty Spivak by Michael Kinburn

Postcolonialism
Essentialism